Hajoca Corporation Headquarters and Showroom is a historic commercial building located in the University City neighborhood of Philadelphia, Pennsylvania. The original section was built in 1921, and expanded in 1930.  It is a two-story, flat roofed building in the Art Deco style.  It is clad in limestone and features decorative brickwork. The building houses WXPN radio and the World Cafe Live, a live music venue dedicated to showcasing live music.

It was added to the National Register of Historic Places in 2003.

Gallery

References

Commercial buildings on the National Register of Historic Places in Philadelphia
Art Deco architecture in Pennsylvania
Commercial buildings completed in 1930
University City, Philadelphia